Jazy Game Reserve (also Ясин Yasin) is a protected area in Özgön District, Osh Region, Kyrgyzstan. It is located in the flood plain of the lower reach of the river Jazy, near the city Özgön. It was established in 1975 to conserve flood plain reed-sandthorn brushwoods and wetlands, serving breeding areas for pheasant, and wintering ground for water-fowl birds.  The reserve occupies 5,000 hectares.

References
 

Game reserves in Kyrgyzstan
Protected areas established in 1975